Botticelli is a crater on Mercury. Its name was adopted by the International Astronomical Union (IAU) in 1979. Botticelli is named for the Italian painter Sandro Botticelli, who lived from 1445 to 1510.

Botticelli is one of 110 peak ring basins on Mercury, although its ring is nearly eroded away or flooded by lava.

References

Sandro Botticelli
Impact craters on Mercury